The Patliputra–SMVT Bengaluru Weekly Superfast Express is a Superfast train belonging to East Central Railway zone that runs between  in Patna, Bihar and  in Bangalore, Karnataka. It is currently being operated with 22351/22352 train numbers on a weekly basis. It runs with LHB coach with effect from 27 December 2019.

Service

The 22351/Patliputra–SMVT Bengaluru Weekly Express has an average speed of 56 km/hr and covers 2711 km in 48h 40m. The 22352/SMVT Bengaluru–Patliputra Weekly Express has an average speed of 56 km/hr and covers 2711 km in 48h 40m.

Route and halts 

The important halts of the train are:

 
 
 Pt. Deen Dayal Upadhyaya Junction (Mughal Sarai)

Coach composition

The train has highly refurbished LHB coach with max speed of 110 kmph. The train consists of 22 coaches:

 1 AC First Class
 2 AC II Tier 
 6 AC III Tier
 1 AC III Tier Economy
 6 Sleeper coaches
 1 Pantry Car
 3 General Unreserved
 2 End-on Generator

Traction

Both trains are hauled by an Itarsi Loco Shed-based WDP-4D diesel locomotive from Patna to Itarsi. From Itarsi the train is hauled by an Itarsi Loco Shed-based WAP-4 electric locomotive until Chennai. From Chennai the train is hauled by an Itarsi Loco Shed-based WAP-4 electric locomotive until Yesvantpur, and vice versa.

Direction reversal

The train reverses its direction 1 times:

Schedule

See also 

 Patliputra Junction railway station
 Yesvantpur Junction railway station
 Sanghamithra Express

References

External links 

 22351/Patliputra - Yesvantpur Express India Rail Info
 22352/Yesvantpur - Patliputra Express India Rail Info

Transport in Patna
Transport in Bangalore
Express trains in India
Rail transport in Bihar
Rail transport in Uttar Pradesh
Rail transport in Madhya Pradesh
Rail transport in Maharashtra
Rail transport in Telangana
Rail transport in Andhra Pradesh
Rail transport in Tamil Nadu
Rail transport in Karnataka
Railway services introduced in 2013